The 2011 Rolex Sports Car Series season was the twelfth season of Grand-Am's premier series. Continental Tire became the official tire partner for Grand-Am, replacing Pirelli after three seasons due to Pirelli's departure to FIA Formula One, GP2 Asia Series and GP2 Series (now FIA Formula 2 Championship) as well as increasing GP3 Series (now FIA Formula 3 Championship) involvement as an official tire partner after FIA World Motor Sport Council meeting verdict event in Geneva, Switzerland on June 24, 2010. The company purchased the naming rights of the RSCS's support series, the Grand-Am Cup Series, from KONI in 2010.

The season began with the Rolex 24 at Daytona on January 29 and finished with the EMCO Gears Classic at the Mid-Ohio Sports Car Course on September 17.

A notable change is the television coverage. In contrast to 2010, about half of the races were not televised live.

Schedule

The official schedule was released October 18, 2010, and consisted of twelve rounds. Road America appears on the schedule after a nine-year absence, while Laguna Seca returns after its absence from the schedule in 2010. The second race at Daytona and Miller Motorsports Park do not return.

Teams and drivers
{|
|

Changes
Will Turner announced that he will field two BMW M3s in the Rolex Sports Car Series for 2011.

Memo Gidley joined Team Sahlen for the 2011 season.

Spirit of Daytona Racing announced on October 11, 2010, that they would be changing to a Chevrolet-powered prototype. SunTrust Racing also announced on October 6 that they would return to the Chevrolet powerplant after two years of using a Ford powerplant.

It was announced on October 12, 2010 that Brumos Racing would be fielding a Porsche 911 GT3 for 2011 in a return to the team's roots. The drivers will be Leh Keen and Andrew Davis.

It was announced on October 13, 2010 that Blackforest Motorsports would be returning to the series, fielding a Ford Mustang.

It was announced on October 22, 2010 that Toro Corse would be entering two Lamborghini Gallardos in the GT class.

Results

Championship Standings

Daytona Prototypes

Driver's (Top 30)

Notes
 Drivers denoted by † did not complete sufficient laps in order to score points.

Chassis

Engine

Grand Touring

Driver's (Top 10)

Notes
 Drivers denoted by † did not complete sufficient laps in order to score points.

Engine

References

External links
 The official website of Grand-Am

Rolex Sports Car Series
Rolex Sports Car Series